Kailashey Kelengkari is a 1974 mystery novel by Indian writer Satyajit Ray featuring the private detective Feluda.It was produced by the son of Satyajit Ray, Sandip Ray. Here, Sabyasachi Chakrabarty played the role of Feluda.

Plot summary

Super Sleuth Feluda goes after a gang of smugglers - who steal and smuggle out the country's valuable treasure, the unique stone figures that adorn  ancient temples of India. In the bait, he has to take up multiple disguises, encounter many shady characters, all  in the land of Kailash Temple in Ellora. He does however get a little help from his able assistant & cousin Topshe and best friend Lalmohan Ganguly.

Adaptation

The novel was adapted into a film of the same name based on the same plot and was directed by the author's son, Sandip Ray.

References 

1974 novels
Feluda (series)
Novels by Satyajit Ray
Indian novels adapted into films
Novels set in Maharashtra
1974 Indian novels